The 2015–16 season is Valencia Basket's 30th in existence and the club's 20th consecutive season in the top flight of Spanish basketball. Valencia is involved in three competitions.

Players

Players in 

|}

Total spending:  €0

Players out 

|}

Total income:  €0

Total expenditure: €0

Club

Technical staff

Kit 
Supplier: Luanvi

Pre-season and friendlies

Competitions

Overall

Overview 
{| class="wikitable" style="text-align:center"
|-
! rowspan="2" | Competition
! colspan="8" | Record
|-
! 
! 
! 
! 
! 
! 
! 
! 
|-
| Liga ACB

|- style="background:#EEEEEE"
| Copa del Rey

|-
| Eurocup

|-
! Total

Liga ACB

League table

Results summary

Results by round

Matches

Results overview

Eurocup

Regular season

Last 32

Copa del Rey

Statistics

Liga ACB

Copa del Rey

Eurocup

References

External links 
 Official website
 Valencia BC at ACB.com 
 Valencia BC at the Eurocup

Valencia BC
 
Val